Ionuţ Gheorghe (born 29 February 1984 in Constanţa, Romania) is a boxer from Romania.

Career
He qualified for the 2004 Summer Olympics by ending up in first place at the 3rd AIBA European 2004 Olympic Qualifying Tournament in Gothenburg, Sweden. In Athens, Greece he won a bronze medal, having been stopped in the semifinals of the Light welterweight (64 kg) division by eventual winner Manus Boonjumnong.

Gheorghe won another bronze medal in the same division two years later, at the 2006 European Amateur Boxing Championships in Plovdiv where he lost to local Boris Georgiev.

At the 2007 World Championships he was upset by Iranian Morteza Sepahvand but he qualified for the Olympics at the first qualifier.

Olympic results 2004 
Defeated Faisal Karim (Pakistan) 26-11
Defeated Mustafa Karagöllü (Turkey) 28-19
Defeated Michele Di Rocco (Italy) 29-18
Lost to Manus Boonjumnong (Thailand) 9-30

References

1984 births
Living people
Light-welterweight boxers
Boxers at the 2004 Summer Olympics
Boxers at the 2008 Summer Olympics
Olympic boxers of Romania
Olympic bronze medalists for Romania
Olympic medalists in boxing
Medalists at the 2004 Summer Olympics
Romanian male boxers